Vogue Arabia is the Arab edition of Vogue magazine. It is distributed in several Arab countries, including Saudi Arabia, Bahrain, Qatar, Kuwait, Oman, the United Arab Emirates, Jordan and Lebanon.

Vogue Arabia became the 22nd edition of Vogue when its first issue was published in March 2017. Princess Deena Aljuhani Abdulaziz served as the launch editor-in-chief of the magazine until April 2017. Since April 2017, Manuel Arnaut has been the new editor-in-chief.

History

2016: Foundation and digital launching
In the second half of 2016, it was announced by Condé Nast International, that Vogue Arabia will be launched in Autumn 2016 as a digital website, and in Spring 2017 as a print magazine. Saudi Princess Deena Aljuhani Abdulaziz was appointed as editor-in-chief for the magazine. The publication is a partnership between Condé Nast and Dubai-based media company Nervora.

In October 2016, Vogue Arabia was first released as a dual language website, in Arabic and English, marking the first edition of a Vogue magazine to focus on digital media over print media. It started as Style.com/Arabia but was replaced and rebranded as Vogue.me by the end of 2016.

2017–present: Print launching, Abdulaziz exit and Arnaut arrival 
On 1 March 2017, it was revealed the first cover for the magazine, with model Gigi Hadid photographed by Inez and Vinoodh, described as "...one poised photograph, she communicates a thousand words to a region that’s been waiting far too long for its Vogue voice to speak", by editor-in-chief, Deena Aljuhani Abdulaziz. On 13 April, it was announced that after two issues, editor Deena Aljuhani Abdulaziz was fired as editor-in-chief. The editor stated: "I am proud of what I have been able to accomplish in such a short space of time... It had initially been my intention to build this important and groundbreaking edition of Vogue from inception to a mature magazine in line with others in the Vogue stable." On 14 April, a few days after Abdulaziz exit announcement, Shashi Menon, CEO and publisher Nervora, revealed that Manuel Arnaut will be the new editor-in-chief of Vogue Arabia, effective 7 May 2017.

Digital strategy
In a historic move for a Vogue magazine edition, Vogue Arabia was digital-first launch in October 2016, preceding the print edition, that was launched in March 2017. Shashi Menon, CEO of Nervora, partner of Condé Nast in Middle East stated that "the decision to launch digital-first is a bold, declarative statement we are making on the future of publishing and consistent with Vogue's long history of reinvention".

Editors
 Deena Aljuhani Abdulaziz, 2016–2017
 Manuel Arnaut, 2017–present

References

External links
 Official Website

Condé Nast magazines
Fashion websites
Lifestyle magazines
Magazines established in 2016
Online magazines
Women's fashion magazines
Arabia
Arabic-language magazines